Hopkinton State Park is a Massachusetts state park located in the towns of Hopkinton and Ashland and managed by the Department of Conservation and Recreation. The park was created after the Hopkinton Reservoir was removed from service as a water source for the Greater Boston area. In 2010, it was named as one of the 1,000 places to visit by the Great Places in Massachusetts Commission.

Activities and amenities
The park features beaches and a bathing pond for swimming that is physically separated from Hopkinton Reservoir, where nonmotorized boating is permitted. There are seasonal facilities for kayak and canoe rental. 
Park trails may be used for hiking, mountain biking, horseback riding, cross-country skiing, and snowmobiling.
There is also a camp for children and teenagers that teaches sailing, kayaking, canoeing, stand up paddle boarding and windsurfing.
Picnicking, restrooms, and fishing are also features of the park.

Gallery

References

External links
Hopkinton State Park Department of Conservation and Recreation
Trail Map Department of Conservation and Recreation

State parks of Massachusetts
Parks in Middlesex County, Massachusetts
1947 establishments in Massachusetts
Protected areas established in 1947